The Channon is a village in the Northern Rivers area of New South Wales, Australia. It is about 18 kilometres northwest of Lismore and about 21 km from Nimbin, NSW.  It is part of the City of Lismore. The name of the village, Channon, comes from a local Aboriginal term for the Burrawang palm, a type of cycad that proliferates along the ridgelines in the area.

The Channon family have always maintained an oral history that two ancestors, Thomas Channon and James Channon were in this area assaying for gold. They had both been active in the Adelong goldfields (Thomas topping the gold yield there in 1859, and being a partner in the Great Western Battery, used for stamping the gold from quartz); he then applied for a claim in Gympie (the Lucknow Reef claim) on 26 Feb 1868. One of the main streets of Gympie is Channon Street, declared such in 1870, to honour the Channon brothers contribution to Gympie. They also had major gold mines in West Wyalong ("True Blue" and "Brilliant" mines) in 1886. In the nine year period between their Adelong presence, and arrival at the Gympie gold rush in 1868, we believe they spent time in the area now known as "The Channon" (pronounced with the "ch" as in "church") and that is why the town still retains that name. (Sources: "Looking Backward: The Adelong Goldfields" by EW Northwood; Gympie Regional Council website. Supplied by B.H.Channon.) 

Like many villages in the area, there is cattle farming, general grazing and small crop farming.  There are also many permaculture and organic farms and macadamia and coffee plantations, as well as a number of intentional communities. Zaytuna Farm is a working permaculture education and demonstration farm, whose managing director is Geoff Lawton. Like nearby Nimbin, The Channon is a gateway to the rainforests of Nightcap National Park.

On the second Sunday of each month, a crafts market is held at the local Channon oval which attracts visitors, musicians and vendors from around the district.

The Coronation Park hosts a yearly outdoor opera, though it did not take place in 2016.

References

External links
 Permaculture farm in the area
 Map of the Channon

Towns in New South Wales
Northern Rivers